Arding & Hobbs is a former department store and Grade II listed building at the junction of Lavender Hill and St John's Road, Battersea, in the London Borough of Wandsworth.

Arding & Hobbs was established in 1876. The original building was destroyed by a fire on 20 December 1909. The present building was constructed in 1910 in an Edwardian Baroque style, and the architect was James Gibson.

The department store sold to the John Anstiss Group in 1938, before John Anstiss was purchased by United Drapery Stores in 1948 and was added to their Allders group in the 1970s. Allders went into administration in 2005 and was subsequently broken up and sold. The main part of the Arding & Hobbs building was split between a branch of Debenhams department store and TK Maxx retail. As of 9 June 2020, the Debenhams section of the building has been permanently closed.

The store and building is featured in a number of films and television programmes including the 1981 action-thriller Nighthawks, where the shop was bombed, and the 1994 Mr. Bean episode "Do-It-Yourself Mr. Bean". It is very prominent in the video "Life On Your Own" by the band The Human League which is set in a future, apocalytic London where the lead singer is the only person left alive and lives in the building.

References

External links
 

1876 establishments in England
Allders
Commercial buildings completed in 1910
Debenhams
Defunct department stores of the United Kingdom
Edwardian architecture in London
Grade II listed buildings in the London Borough of Wandsworth
History of the London Borough of Wandsworth